Claude Perrot (born 10 May 1951 in Moûtiers) is a retired French alpine skier who competed in the 1976 Winter Olympics, where he finished 29th in the Men's giant slalom.

External links
 sports-reference.com
 

1951 births
Living people
French male alpine skiers
Olympic alpine skiers of France
Alpine skiers at the 1976 Winter Olympics
Sportspeople from Savoie
20th-century French people